Odia, also spelled Oriya or Odiya, may refer to:
 Odia people in Odisha, India
 Odia language, an Indian language, belonging to the Indo-Aryan branch of the Indo-European language family
 Odia alphabet, a writing system used for the Odia language
 Oriya (Unicode block), a block of Odia characters in Unicode
 Odia (name), including a list of people with the name

See also
 
 

Language and nationality disambiguation pages